Mistletoe Plantation was a quail hunting plantation located in extreme northwest Leon County, Florida and southeast Grady County, Georgia established by Mrs. Jean Hanna Gallien.

Owner
Mrs. Jean Hanna Gallien was the granddaughter of Melvin Hanna of M. A. Hanna Company, a mining and steel company.  Mistletoe is near her grandfather's Melrose Plantation and Sinkhola Plantation owned by her sister Mrs. Warren Bicknell, Jr.

Mistletoe continues to be a conservation easement for Tall Timbers Research Station and Land Conservancy.

References

Plantations in Leon County, Florida